Bill Edwards  (September 14, 1918 – December 21, 1999) was an American film and television actor, championship rodeo rider, and artist.

Selected filmography

 Adventure in Iraq (1943) as Radio Operator
 You Can't Ration Love (1944) as Pete Allen, big man on campus
 Hail the Conquering Hero (1943) as Forrest Noble
 Our Hearts Were Young and Gay (1944) as Tom Newhall
 Miss Susie Slagle's (1946) as Elijah Howe, Jr.
 The Virginian (1946) as Sam Bennett
 Our Hearts Were Growing Up (1946) as Tom Newhall
 Danger Street (1947) as Sandy Evans
 Home in San Antone (1949) as Ted Gibson
 Trail of the Yukon (1949) as Jim Blaine
 The Fighting Stallion (1950) as Lon Evans
 Federal Man (1950) as Agent George Palmer 
 Border Outlaws (1950) as Mike Hoskins
 The First Legion (1951) as Joe
 First Man into Space (1959) as Air Force pilot Lt. Dan Milton Prescott
 Sea Hunt ? (1961, Season 4, Episode 19) as USCG Commander Murdock
 Tora! Tora! Tora! (1970) as Colonel Kendall J. Fiedler 
 Inferno in Paradise (1974) as Captain Martin

External links

1918 births
1999 deaths
American male television actors
American male film actors
Male actors from New Jersey
American artists
20th-century American male actors
Deaths from pneumonia in California